The Journal of Manipulative and Physiological Therapeutics is a medical journal of the pseudoscientific medical discipline of chiropractic. It is published by Mosby on behalf of the American Chiropractic Association, of which it is an official journal.

Abstracting and indexing 
The journal is abstracted and indexed in Index Medicus/MEDLINE/PubMed, Current Contents/Clinical Medicine, Science Citation Index Expanded, EMBASE, Excerpta Medica, VINITI Database RAS, and Scopus. According to the Journal Citation Reports, the journal has a 2016 impact factor of 1.592.

References

External links 
 
 Boulder Chiropractor

Mosby academic journals
English-language journals
Publications with year of establishment missing
Publications established in 1978
Academic journals associated with learned and professional societies
Chiropractic journals
9 times per year journals